Jaan Velt (26 February 1898 Kaarli Parish (now Mulgi Parish), Kreis Pernau – 24 April 1925 Tallinn) was an Estonian politician, communist. He was a member of II Riigikogu. He was a member of the Riigikogu since 20 May 1924. He replaced Jaan Rea. On 29 January 1925, he was removed from his position and he was replaced by Peeter Lindau.

In 1925 he was executed because he took part of 1924 Estonian coup d'état attempt.

References

1898 births
1925 deaths
People from Mulgi Parish
People from Kreis Pernau
workers' United Front politicians
Members of the Riigikogu, 1923–1926
People executed for treason against Estonia